Giovanni Battista Dellepiane (21 February 1889 – 13 August 1961) was an Italian prelate of the Catholic Church who spent his career in the diplomatic service of the Holy See, including nineteen years leading the Vatican's mission to the Belgian Congo.

Biography
Giovanni Battista Dellepiane was born in Genoa on 21 February 1889. He was ordained a priest on 25 July 1914.

On 18 July 1929, when he was already serving as the Apostolic Administrator of the Archdiocese of Izmir, Turkey, Pope Pius named him titular archbishop of Stauropolis. He received his episcopal consecration from Cardinal Willem van Rossum on 30 November 1929.

On 18 January 1930, Pope Pius named him its first Apostolic Delegate to the Belgian Congo (later the Democratic Republic of the Congo). He received a noble title in 1947 from Mutara III, King of Rwanda. 

On 12 January 1949, Pope Pius XII appointed him Apostolic Internuncio to Austria.

He died on 13 August 1961.

See also 

 Catholic Church in Africa
Delle Piane family
Roman Catholic Archdiocese of Izmir

References

External links
Catholic Hierarchy: Archbishop Giovanni Battista Dellepiane

1889 births
1961 deaths
Clergy from Genoa
Apostolic Nuncios to the Democratic Republic of the Congo
Apostolic Nuncios to Austria
20th-century Italian Roman Catholic titular archbishops